Mylleas (perhaps Myllenas) son of Zoilus was a Beroean trierarch of Nearchus appointed by Alexander the Great.
Possibly father of a certain Alexander.

References

Ancient Beroeans
Trierarchs of Nearchus' fleet
4th-century BC Macedonians